Live at the O2 London, England is a DVD by Kings of Leon released on November 10, 2009. It features the band's show on June 30, 2009, at the O2 Arena in London, England. The concert was also released on Blu-ray.

Track listing
"Notion"
"Be Somebody"
"Taper Jean Girl"
"My Party"
"Molly's Chambers"
"Red Morning Light"
"Fans"
"California Waiting"
"Milk"
"Closer"
"Crawl"
"Four Kicks"
"Charmer"
"Sex on Fire"
"The Bucket"
"On Call"
"Cold Desert"
"Use Somebody"
"Slow Night, So Long"
"Knocked Up"
"Manhattan"
"Black Thumbnail"

Personnel
 Caleb Followill - lead vocals, rhythm guitar
 Nathan Followill - drums, backing vocals
 Jared Followill - bass, synthesizer, backing vocals
 Matthew Followill - lead guitar, backing vocals

Charts

Certifications

References

Kings of Leon albums
2009 video albums
Live video albums
2009 live albums
2000s English-language films